Below are the squads for the 2013 AFF Women's Championship, hosted by Myanmar, which is took place between 9 and 22 September 2013. 10 teams took part in the championships.

Group A

Australia U20

Jordan

Malaysia

Thailand

Vietnam

Group B

Indonesia
Caps and goals counted for the 2013 AFF Women's Championship only.

Japan U23

Laos

Myanmar

Philippines

References

Women's AFF Championship squads
2013 in women's association football